Hemichroa is a genus of sawflies in the family Tenthredinidae.

Species
 Hemichroa australis (Serville, 1823) 
 Hemichroa crocea (Geoffroy in Fourcroy, 1785) 
 Hemichroa monticola Ermolenko, 1960

External links
Biolib

References

Tenthredinidae
Sawfly genera